David Anthony Hearn (born 4 March 1929), known as Tony Hearn, is a former British trade union leader.

Hearn attended Trinity College, Oxford.  He began working for the Association of Broadcasting Staff (ABS) in 1955, as assistant to the General Secretary, Leslie Littlewood.  He moved up through the ranks, becoming one of the Assistant General Secretaries, Deputy General Secretary and eventually General Secretary in 1972.  He also became Secretary of the loose Federation of Broadcasting Unions.

In 1984, Hearn took the ABS into a merger with the National Association of Theatrical and Kine Employees, which formed the Broadcasting and Entertainment Trades Alliance (BETA). He became joint General Secretary of BETA with John Wilson, then sole head of the union in 1987.

In 1991, he BETA it into a further merger, this time with the Association of Cinematograph Television and Allied Technicians, which produced the Broadcasting, Entertainment, Cinematograph and Theatre Union (BECTU). Hearn became its first General Secretary, a position he held until 1993.

References

Asa Briggs, History of Broadcasting in the United Kingdom

1929 births
Living people
Alumni of Trinity College, Oxford
British trade union leaders